Phyllis Nan Sortain "Primrose" Pechey (1909–1994), better known as Fanny Cradock, was an English writer, restaurant critic and television cook.

From 1942 Cradock, writing under the name Frances Dale, published a series of romantic novels; she also used the pseudonym as her by-line when she was the editor of the Sunday Graphic, a position she held for four years. In 1948 she, with her partner Major Johnnie Cradock, joined The Daily Telegraph, writing a food and drink column under the nom de plume "Bon Viveur". The columns were published in book form, and the Cradocks produced several works detailing travels around European eateries. From 1955 Cradock began appearing on television either on her own, or with Johnnie. According to her biographer Paul Levy, his character was portrayed as "the subservient sidekick, good only for handing Fanny her frying pan and knowing which wine to serve". According to Eddie Dyja, writing for the British Film Institute, Fanny's onscreen character was, "bossy, [with] no-nonsense delivery, and [an] unusual penchant for glamour".

From 1975 Cradock published a series of ten historical novels set at the fictional "Castle Rising". According to the author's foreword to The Lormes of Castle Rising (1975), when Cradock began writing the book in 1966, she was unaware of the existence of a real Castle Rising in Norfolk. The novels, while fiction, take some inspiration from Cradock's own genealogy; for example, the crest of the Lormes features the same astrolabe as the crest of her Norman ancestor Gilbert de Peche.

Television work

Novels

Cookery books

Part works, etc

Children's fiction

Travel books

Autobiography
Two works, both published under the name Fanny Cradock.

Cookery books, as contributor

Cookery booklets

References and sources

References

Sources

Books

Journals, newspapers and magazines

Websites
 
 
 
 

Bibliographies by writer
Bibliographies of British writers